Seven Up is the third studio album by German krautrock band Ash Ra Tempel and their only album recorded in collaboration with American psychologist/drug advocate Timothy Leary. It was first released in 1973.

Background and recording
Seven Up was mainly recorded at the Sinus Studio in Bern, Switzerland in August 1972. Some tracks, like the vocals on "Downtown" by Portia Nkomo and Michael Duwe, were recorded later at Studio Dieter Dierks near Cologne, Germany.

Timothy Leary was living in exile in Switzerland at the time of the album's creation, having escaped from prison in San Luis Obispo, California in September 1970.

The name "Seven Up" was thought up by lyricist Brian Barritt, after the group were given a bottle of the lemonade drink 7 Up that had been spiked with LSD.

Track listing
Music by Ash Ra Tempel, lyrics by Timothy Leary and Brian Barritt

Personnel
Hartmut "Hawk" Enke - bass, guitar, synth/electronics
Manuel Göttsching - guitar, synth/electronics
Timothy Leary - voice, "direction", lyrics
Michael Duwe - voice, flute

Additional personnel
Brian Barritt - voice, lyrics, arrangements
Liz Elliott - voice
Bettina Hohls - voice
Portia Nkomo - voice
Steve Schroyder - organ, synth/electronics
Dieter Burmeister - drums
Tommie Engel - drums
Dieter Dierks - synthesizer, radio downtown, recording
Klaus D. Müller - performer (no role specified)
Peter Geitner - design (cover)
Walter Wegmüller - painting (cover paintings)
Rolf-Ulrich Kaiser - production
Gille Lettmann - co-production
Kurt Zimmermann - recording (Sinus-studio)

References

1973 albums
Ash Ra Tempel albums